P. David Hornik (born 1954) is a writer, translator, copyeditor, and commentator living in Be'er Sheva, Israel.

Biography
Hornik was born in New York City and grew up not far from Albany, New York. In 1984 he moved to Israel and has lived in Jerusalem, Tel Aviv, and Beersheba.

Literary career
Up to 2003 Hornik contributed commentary to the Jerusalem Post and to American Jewish magazines such as Moment, Midstream, and others. Hornik was also a frequent book reviewer for the Jerusalem Post.

Since 2003 Hornik has contributed to PJ Media, The American Spectator, FrontPage Magazine, American Thinker, ynetnews.com, the Jerusalem Post, and The Jewish Press, and blogged at The Times of Israel. His literary work, including poetry and short stories, has been published at National Review, New English Review, and Jewish Quarterly.

He is the author of the essay collection Choosing Life in Israel (2013), the novel You Don't Know What Love Is (2018), the short-story collection Help Me, Rhonda and Other Stories (2019), the novel Beside the Still Waters (2019), and the novel And Both Shall Row (2020).

Hornik's fiction deals intensively with human interaction, and with the effects of time, memory, and geography on characters' understanding of themselves and of others.

See also
Israeli literature

References

The American Spectator people
1954 births
Living people
Writers from New York City
American expatriates in Israel